The 1982 Lafayette Leopards football team was an American football team that represented Lafayette College as an independent during the 1982 NCAA Division I-AA football season.

In their second year under head coach Bill Russo, the Leopards compiled a 7–3 record. Bob Mahr and Ed Stahl were the team captains.

Though the team went unranked in the  Division I-AA Football Committee poll during the season, the five-game winning streak at the end of the schedule secured a No. 20 rank in the final week of the poll, released November 24.

Lafayette played its home games at Fisher Field on College Hill in Easton, Pennsylvania.

Schedule

References

Lafayette
Lafayette Leopards football seasons
Lafayette Leopards football